This is a list of presidents of the Municipality of Niš, presidents of the City Assembly of Niš and mayors of Niš since 1878.

The Mayor of Niš is the head of the City of Niš (the third largest city in Serbia). He acts on behalf of the City, and performs an executive function in the City of Niš. The current Mayor of Niš is Dragana Sotirovski (SNS).

Principality of Serbia
Dimitrije Kocić-Asardžijski (1878 – 1882)

Kingdom of Serbia
Dimitrije Kocić-Asardžijski (1882 – 1894)
Đorđe Genčić (1894 – 1899) (Liberal Party)
Todor Milovanović (1899 – 1910) (Liberal Party)
Nikola Uzunović (1910 – 1918) (People's Radical Party) (Bulgarian occupation 1915 – 1918)

Kingdom of Serbs, Croats and Slovenes / Kingdom of Yugoslavia
Petar Stanković (1 December 1918 – 13 January 1919)
Milan Joksimović (13 January 1919 – 5 January 1920) (acting President of the Municipality)
Sotir Zdravković (5 January 1920 – August 1920) (acting President of the Municipality)
Pavle Stojković (August 1920 – June 1920) (Communist Party of Yugoslavia) (elected President of the Municipality)
Aleksandar Donković, Matija Kuzmanović and Nikola Marković (June 1920 – 25 September 1921) (provisional executive of the Municipality)
Ljuba Aranđelović (25 September 1921 – August 1923) (elected President of the Municipality)
Dragiša Cvetković (August 1923 – 7 November 1929) (elected President of the Municipality)
Milorad Čavdarević (7 November 1929 – 15 February 1935) (appointed President of the Municipality)
Dragiša Cvetković (15 February 1935 – 1936)
Dragutin Petković (1936 – 1938)
Dragutin Živković (1938 – 1941)

Nedić's regime under Nazi German occupation
Jovan Čemerikić (1941 – 1944)

DF Yugoslavia / FPR Yugoslavia / SFR Yugoslavia

Ivan Vučković (1958 – 1963) (League of Communists of Yugoslavia)
Ratko Mitić (1963 – 1974) (League of Communists of Yugoslavia)
Vladimir Petrović (1974 – 1979) (League of Communists of Yugoslavia)
Milibor Jovanović (1979 – 1982) (League of Communists of Yugoslavia)
Božidar Jocić (1982 – 1989) (League of Communists of Yugoslavia)
Vojkan Mitić (1989 – 1990) (League of Communists of Yugoslavia)

FR Yugoslavia / Serbia and Montenegro

Republic of Serbia

Sources
Web Page of the City of Niš

 
Nis